Blue Vibes is the debut album by American jazz vibraphonist Johnny Lytle which was recorded in 1960 for the Jazzland label.

Reception

David Szatmary of Allmusic notes this album "introduced Lytle's bluesy funk".

Track listing
All compositions by Johnny Lytle except as indicated
 "Blue Vibes" - 5:36  
 "Over the Rainbow" (Harold Arlen, Yip Harburg) - 5:16  
 "For Heaven's Sake" (Elise Bretton, Sherman Edwards, Donald Meyer) - 4:35  
 "Movin' Nicely" (Milt Jackson) - 4:57  
 "Autumn Leaves" (Joseph Kosma, Johnny Mercer, Jacques Prévert) - 7:06  
 "Mister Trundel" - 6:27
 "Canadian Sunset" (Eddie Heywood, Norman Gimbel) - 6:21

Personnel 
Johnny Lytle - vibraphone  
Milton Harris - organ
Albert Heath - drums

References 

1960 debut albums
Johnny Lytle albums
Jazzland Records (1960) albums